Onnuria tenuiella is a moth in the family Lecithoceridae. It was described by Kyu-Tek Park in 2011. It is found in Papua New Guinea.

References

Moths described in 2011
Onnuria